Johnson Township is one of eleven townships in Ripley County, Indiana. As of the 2010 census, its population was 3,685 and it contained 1,664 housing units.

Geography

Cities and towns
 Versailles

Unincorporated towns
 Correct

References

External links
 Indiana Township Association
 United Township Association of Indiana

Townships in Ripley County, Indiana
Townships in Indiana